Eugenia foetida is a member of the family Myrtaceae, the myrtle family, and is colloquially referred to as "Spanish stopper" or "boxleaf stopper."

It is found year-round in the understory of mangrove forests, coastal hammocks and dunes in coastal, central to southern Florida, and east in the Bahamas.

Description
It is a common small tree with opposite leaves that are dark green on the adaxial (upper or dorsal) leaf surface and lighter on the abaxial (lower or ventral) surface and oblanceolate with a rounded or obtuse apex. The specific epithet , Latin for "fetid" refers to the unpleasant scent of the flowers.

See also
Bahamian dry forests
South Florida rocklands

References

External links
Key West Tropical Forest and Botanical Garden - Eugenia foetida

foetida
Flora of the Bahamas
Flora of Florida
Plants described in 1806
Flora without expected TNC conservation status